The long-billed corella or slender-billed corella (Cacatua tenuirostris) is a cockatoo native to Australia, which is similar in appearance to the little corella. This species is mostly white, with a reddish-pink face and forehead, and has a long, pale beak, which is used to dig for roots and seeds. It has reddish-pink feathers on the breast and belly.

Taxonomy
The long-billed corella does not have any recognized subspecies. The first formal written description was by German naturalist Heinrich Kuhl in 1820. It is one of several related species of cockatoos called corellas and classified in the subgenus Licmetis within the genus Cacatua, members of which are known as "white cockatoos".

Description 
The adult long-billed corella measures from 38 to 41 cm in length, has a wingspan around 80–90 cm, and averages 567 g in weight. It has a long, bone-coloured beak, and a rim of featherless, bluish skin around the eyes. The plumage is predominantly white with reddish feathers around the eyes and lores. The underside of the wings and tail feathers are tinged with yellow.

Distribution and habitat 
The long-billed corella can be found in the wild in Victoria and southeastern New South Wales. It has extended its range since the 1970s into Melbourne, Victoria and can now be found in Tasmania, South Australia and southeast Queensland. A feral population resides in Perth, Western Australia as of the mid-1980s, which has conservation implications as this species may hybridize with the endangered western corella.  

The long-billed corella is found in grassy woodlands and grasslands, including pasture, fields of agricultural crop, and urban parks.

Ecology and behaviour

Call 
The call of the long-billed corella is a quick, quavering, falsetto !, or  combined with harsh screeches.

Breeding 
Breeding generally takes place in Austral winter to spring (from July to November). Long-billed corellas form monogamous pairs and both sexes share the task of building the nest, incubating the eggs, and caring for the young. Nests are made in decayed debris, the hollows of large old eucalypts, and occasionally in the cavities of loose gravely cliffs. 2–3 dull white, oval eggs are laid on a lining of decayed wood. The incubation period is around 24 days and chicks spend about 56 days in the nest.

Feeding 
The long-billed corella typically digs for roots, seeds, corms, and bulbs, especially from the weed onion grass. Native plants eaten include murnong Microseris lanceolata, but a substantial portion of the bird's diet now includes introduced plants.

Relationship with humans

As pets 

Long-billed corellas are now popular as pets in many parts of Australia, although they were formerly uncommon, and their captive population has stabilised in the last decade. This may be due to their ability to mimic words and whole sentences to near perfection. The long-billed corella has been labeled the best "talker" of the Australian cockatoos, and possibly of all native Psittacines.

As pests 
Long-billed corellas are viewed as agricultural pests, particularly in western Victoria and Western Australia. They can create significant crop damage and are also well known for tearing up pieces of asphalt along roadsides and even damaging power lines. Permits are regularly issued in Western Australia and sometimes issued in Victoria for the culling of this species. Within NSW, the corellas are the most common pest among sporting fields and golf courses, as they can dig holes in the ground up to 3 in across and 6 in deep.

In July 2019, in a scene that was said to resemble a "horror movie", about 60 corellas in Adelaide, South Australia, died in a suspected case of poisoning, after "falling from the sky", bleeding from their mouths, and wailing. At least 57 of the birds were long-billed corellas, and a few of them were short-billed corellas. It was hoped that whoever poisoned them would get traced after doing a report on toxicology, which could nevertheless take several weeks to complete, because in Australia, people were required to register if they purchase poisons, according to Sarah King, founder of Casper's Bird Rescue, who witnessed the deaths, and also said that the type of poison was a slow one that takes several weeks to work. Additionally, the local Alexandrina council had beforehand called for short-billed corellas to be culled for damaging crops and chewing on streetlights, damaging built infrastructure such as buildings and sporting equipment, and displacing other native species of birds and bees, possums, and other organisms.

References

External links

long-billed corella
Birds of New South Wales
Birds of Victoria (Australia)
Endemic birds of Australia
Talking birds
long-billed corella